In Greek mythology, Macareus (Ancient Greek: Μακαρεύς, Makareus means "happy") or Macar (/ˈmeɪkər/; Μάκαρ Makar)  was one of the Heliadae, sons of Helios and Rhodos.

Mythology 
Macareus and his brothers, Triopas, Actis and Candalus, were jealous of a fifth brother, Tenages's, skill at science, so they killed him and had to escape from Rhodes upon discovery of their crime. (The two Heliadae Ochimus and Cercaphus stayed aside and remained on the island of Rhodes).

Notes

References 

 Diodorus Siculus, The Library of History translated by Charles Henry Oldfather. Twelve volumes. Loeb Classical Library. Cambridge, Massachusetts: Harvard University Press; London: William Heinemann, Ltd. 1989. Vol. 3. Books 4.59–8. Online version at Bill Thayer's Web Site
 Diodorus Siculus, Bibliotheca Historica. Vol 1-2. Immanel Bekker. Ludwig Dindorf. Friedrich Vogel. in aedibus B. G. Teubneri. Leipzig. 1888–1890. Greek text available at the Perseus Digital Library.

Children of Helios
Demigods in classical mythology
Rhodian characters in Greek mythology
Rhodian mythology